Australian Aircraft Kits Pty Ltd is an Australian aircraft manufacturer based in Taree, New South Wales, that was established in 2003. The company principal is Ole Hartmann.

The company specializes in the design and manufacture of light aircraft in the form of kits for amateur construction and ready-to-fly aircraft in the light-sport aircraft category. The company also does aircraft repair work on homebuilt aircraft.

The company produces four aircraft, the high-wing two-seat Hornet STOL, Hornet Cub and Bushman, plus the shoulder-wing Wasp. The Hornet STOL was named Most Innovative Ultralight Design in 2004 at Narromine.

Aircraft

References

External links

Aircraft manufacturers of Australia
Ultralight aircraft
Homebuilt aircraft